Mohlabetsi Conservancy, borders the Klaserie Game Reserve, which in its turn borders the Kruger Park, close to Hoedspruit, in the Limpopo province, South Africa.

See also 
 Protected areas of South Africa

Protected areas of Limpopo
Nature conservation in South Africa